Meadors is a surname. Notable people with the surname include:

Allen Meadors (born 1947), American professor and university administrator
Marynell Meadors (born 1943), American basketball coach
Nate Meadors (born 1997), American football player